Mamer Lycée may refer to:

 Lycée Technique Josy Barthel, a school in Mamer, in south-western Luxembourg
 Mamer Lycée railway station, a railway station serving the school